László Vigh (born November 3, 1961) is a Hungarian politician, member of the National Assembly (MP) for Zalaszentgrót (Zala County Constituency V) from 2006 to 2014, and for Zalaegerszeg (Zala County Constituency I) since 2014.

He attended elementary school in Pacsa and accomplished his studies in 1975. He passed the secondary school final examinations at Ganz Ábrahám Engineering and Transport Vocational Secondary School in Zalaegerszeg. He worked for the Fényforrás GE of Nagykanizsa from 1982 to 1986. From 1986 he continued his work in the Gelsei Farmers Cooperation.

From 1994 until 2014, he served as the mayor of Felsőrajk. Between 2002 and 2006 he was the Chairman of the Cultural Committee of the General Assembly of Zala County and member of the Committee on Sport and Youth. He was head of the Sport Association of Felsőrajk and leader of the village affairs of the Fidesz branch in Zala County. As a member of the parish church of Felsőrajk he is also an organiser of the local religious activity and head of the civil guard of the town. He is a founding member and member of the board of the recently founded Griff Puppet Theatre. During the parliamentary election held in 2006, he was elected MP for Zalaszentgrót. He was appointed member of the Local Government and Urban Development Committee on 30 May 2006, holding the office until 5 May 2014. He repeated his success as MP for Zalaszentgrót during the 2010 parliamentary election. Vigh was elected MP for Zalaegerszeg in the 2014 and 2018 parliamentary elections. He is a member of the Committee on Legal Affairs since May 2014.

References

1961 births
Living people
Mayors of places in Hungary
Fidesz politicians
Members of the National Assembly of Hungary (2006–2010)
Members of the National Assembly of Hungary (2010–2014)
Members of the National Assembly of Hungary (2014–2018)
Members of the National Assembly of Hungary (2018–2022)
Members of the National Assembly of Hungary (2022–2026)
People from Nagykanizsa